Ameerega pongoensis, formerly Epipedobates pongoensis, is a species of frog in the family Dendrobatidae that is endemic to the San Martín and Loreto Regions of Peru. Its natural habitats are subtropical or tropical moist lowland forests, subtropical or tropical moist montane forests, rivers, freshwater marshes, and intermittent freshwater marshes. It is threatened by encroaching agriculture and is illegally harvested for the pet trade.

References

pongoensis
Vulnerable animals
Endemic fauna of Peru
Amphibians described in 1999
Amphibians of Peru
Taxonomy articles created by Polbot